The Association of Tax Authorities of Islamic Countries (ATAIC;) is an intergovernmental organization and one of the 17 affiliated organs of the Organisation of Islamic Cooperation. Founded in 2003 by the eleven Islamic countries including Pakistan, it is focused on improving and maintaining Islamic taxes, including zakat policies for rapid economic development in the member states. It also serves as a forum of discussion and research institute for the matters associated with the Islamic taxation system.

Headquartered in Khartoum, Sudan, it plays a central role in administration and legislation for the promotion of tax and zakat for economic development and mutual cooperation in the member states. The ATAIC conducts annual seminars, workshops and training courses for gathering tax information needed for analysing and disseminating tax and zakat administration.

History 
The Association of Tax Authorities of Islamic Countries was introduced in 2003, however it became OIC's affiliated organ in December 2010 after the government of Sudan submitted a request to grant the ATAIC an affiliate organ status. The request was formally approved through a resolution no. 7/38-ORG by the OIC Council of Foreign Ministers in its 38th session held in Astana, Kazakhstan between 28 and 30 June 2011.

The organization held its first-ever conference on 4 October 2004 in Putrajaya, Malaysia, the second conference on November 29, 2005, in Tehran, Iran, while third conference was hosted by Pakistan on 22 November 22, 2006. The fourth conference was hosted by Kuwait on 25 November 2007, fifth conference by Indonesia on 26 October 2008, while the sixth and last conference was hosted by Sudan on 11 October 2009 where the organization was granted an affiliate status.

Members 
The ATAIC has 30 member states out of 57. Iran became a member of Executive Council of the organization in 2021.

References 

Organisation of Islamic Cooperation affiliated agencies
2003 establishments in Malaysia
Tax organizations
Intergovernmental organizations